Bharathidasan University (BDU) is a university in the city of Tiruchirappalli, Tamil Nadu, India. It is located on Tiruchirappalli-Pudukkottai  National Highway 336. It has affiliated colleges in the districts of Ariyalur district, Karur, Nagapattinam, Perambalur, Pudukkottai, Thanjavur, Tiruvarur and Tiruchirapalli. It is a recognised university, supported by the University Grants Commission of India. All major faculties of science and arts are represented. The university has totally 4 Faculties, 16 Schools, 37 Departments and 29 Specialized Research Centres.

The University Departments/Schools are offering 151 programmes including 40 PG programmes in M.A., M.Sc. and M.Tech. The above programmes are conducted under the Choice Based Credit System (CBCS) in Semesters: 31 M.Phil., 33 Ph.D., 19 P.G. Diploma, 11 Diploma and 10 Certificates. In addition to the regular teaching programmes in the Departments and Schools, the university under its Distance Education mode is conducting 15 UG and 26 PG programmes. All the UG and PG programmes are conducted under non-semester system and MCA and MBA programmes are conducted under semester system along with the regular programmes. The MCA and MBA programmes conducted under this mode are very popular.

Faculties and schools  
The university has the following faculties and schools:
 Faculty of Arts
 School of Economics and Commerce & Financial Studies
 School of Education
 School of Social Sciences
 School of Skill Development & Entrepreneurship
 School of Performing Arts
 Faculty of Indian and other Languages
 School of English and Foreign Languages
 School of Indian Languages
 Faculty of Science, Engineering and Technology
 School of Basic Medical Sciences
 School of Biotechnology & Genetic Engineering
 School of Chemistry
 School of Computer Science and Engineering
 School of Engineering and Technology
 School of Environmental Sciences
 School of Geography
 School of Geology
 School of Library Information Science
 School of Life Sciences
 School of Marine Sciences
 School of Mathematical Sciences
 School of Physics
 Faculty of Management
 School of Management Studies

Hostels

Men's 
Cavery men's hostel
Bhavani men's hostel  
Vaigai men's hostel
Porunai men's hostel
Sindhu men's hostel

Women's
Ponni women's hostel
Mullai women's hostel
Kurunji women's hostel
Gangai women's hostel

Affiliated colleges

Autonomous arts and science colleges 
1. Government Arts College (Autonomous), Karur - 639 005.

2. Government College (Autonomous), Kumbakonam - 612 001.

3. H.H. The Rajah's College (Autonomous), Pudukkottai - 622 001.

4. Rajah Serfoji Government College, (Autonomous) Thanjavur - 613 005.

5. Thanthai Periyar Government Arts and Science College (Autonomous), Tiruchirappalli - 620 023.

6. Government College for Women (Autonomous), Kumbakonam - 612 001.

7. K. N. Government College for Women (Autonomous) Thanjavur - 613 007.

8. Kaalaignar Karunanidhi Government Arts College for Women, (Autonomous)
Pudukkottai - 622 001.

9. A.V.V.M. Sri Pushpam College (Autonomous), Poondi - 613 503.

10. Bishop Heber College, (Autonomous) Tiruchirappalli - 620 017

11. Jamal Mohamed College, (Autonomous) Tiruchirappalli - 620 020.

12. National College (Autonomous), Tiruchirappalli - 620 001

13. Nehru Memorial College, (Autonomous) Puthanampatti - 621 007.

14. St. Joseph's College (Autonomous), Tiruchirappalli - 620 002.

15. A.D.M. College for Women, (Autonomous) Nagapattinam - 611 001.

16. Holy Cross College (Autonomous), Tiruchirappalli - 620 002.

17. Seethalakshmi Ramaswami College, (Autonomous) Tiruchirappalli - 620 002.

18. Edayathangudi G.S. Pillai Arts & Science College, Nagapattinam - 611 001.

19. J.J. College of Arts & Science(Autonomous), Namanasamuthiram, Pudukkottai - 622 404

20. Srimad Andavan Arts & Science College, Thiruvanaikoil, Tiruchirappalli - 620 005.

21. Thanthai Hans Roever College, Perambalur - 621 212.

22. Cauvery College for Women (Autonomous), Annamalai Nagar, Tiruchirappalli - 620 018

23. Dhanalakshmi Srinivasan College of Arts & Science for Women, Perambalur - 621 212

24. Sengamala Thayaar Educational Trust Women's College, Mannargudi - 614 001

Non-autonomous arts and science colleges 

1. A.A. Government Arts College, Musiri - 621 201.

2. Dr. Kalaignar Government Arts College, Kulithalai (Sattamandra Ponvizha), Ayyar Malai, Kulithalai, Karur - 639 120

3. Dr. Puratchi Thalaivar M.G.R.Govt. Arts & Science College, (Boys Higher Secondary School) Kudavasal 612 601, Thiruvarur District

4. Government Arts & Science College(Co-Education), Veppanthattai, Perambalur.

5. Government Arts and Science College, Community Hall, Amman Nagar, Aravakurichi TK, Karur Dt - 639201.

6. Government Arts and Science College, Govt. Boys Higher Secondary School Campus, Thirumayam TK - Pudukottai Dt - 622507.

7. Government Arts and Science College, Old Block Development Office, Poothalur, Thanjavur Dt. - 613 102.

8. Government Arts and Science college, Govt. Polytechnic campus, Aranthangi - 614 616.

9. Government Arts and Science College, Jayankondam, Ariyalur Dt. - 621 802.

10. Government Arts and Science College, Kadambadi Main Road, Opp. ADJ Dharamambal Polytechnic, Nagappattinam - 611 001.

11. Government Arts and Science College, Karambakudi, Pudukkottai District

12. Government Arts and Science College, Lalgudi - 621 601

13. Government Arts and Science College, Perambalur -621 107.

14. Government Arts and Science College, Peravurani, Thanjavur District

15. Government Arts and Science College, Punchayat Union Model Primary School, Pannankombu, Manapparai TK, Tiruchirappalli 621306

16. Government Arts and Science College, Regional ITI Campus, Kalaignar Nagar, Alangudi TK - Pudukottai - 622301

17. Government Arts and Science College, Tharagampatti, Karur (Dt.)

18. Government Arts College, Ariyalur - 621 713.

19. Government Arts College, Tiruchirappalli - 620 022

20. Government College of Arts and Science, Govt. Boys Higher Secondary School Campus, South Street, Nannilam - Thiurvarur (Dt.) 610 105.

21. Government College of Arts and Science, Opp. To Kasturibai Gandhi Kanniya Gurukulam, Nagai Road, Vedaranyam - 614 810.

22. Government College of Arts and Science, Govt. Higher Secondary School Campus, Inamkulathur - 621 203

23. Government College of Arts and Science, Thandalaichery, Velur Post,
Thiruthuraipoondi- 614 715, Thiruvarur (Dt.)

24. M.R. Government Arts College, Mannargudi - 614 001.

25. Thiru. Vi. Ka. Government Arts College, Thiruvarur - 610 003.

26. Government Arts and Science College (Women), Orathanad - 614 625

27. Government Arts and Science College for Women, Jamiya Elementary School Campus, Jinnah Street, Koothanallur, Tiruvarur Dt. - 614101

28. Government Arts and Science College for Women, Veppur, Perambalur District

29. Ganesar Senthamil College of Arts and Science, Melaisivapuri - 622 403.

30. Khadir Mohideen College, Adirampattinam - 614 701

31. Rajah's College, Thiruvaiyaru - 613 204.

32. S.K.S.S. Arts College, Thiruppanandal - 612 504.

33. Tamilavel Umamaheswaranar Karanthai Arts College, Thanjavur - 613 002.

34. Urumu Dhanalakshmi College, Tiruchirappalli - 620 019.

35. Aadhavan Arts and Science College, Alathur Village Chettiyappatti Panchayat, Manapparai T.K., Tiruchirappalli-621 306

36. ABI & ABI College, Vayalur, Thanjavur - 613 003.

37. Adaikala Matha College, Arun Nagar, Vallam, Thanjavur - 613 403.

38. Annai College of Arts & Science, Kumbakonam-612 503.

39. Annai Vailankanni Arts & Science College, V.O.C. Nagar Thanjavur 613 007

40. Arputha College of Arts & Science, Arputha Nagar, Vamban - 622 303

41. Arungarai Amman College of Arts & Science, Karur District - 639 202

42. Bharath College of Science & Management, South Garden, Thanjavur - 613 007.

43. Cambridge College of Arts and Science, Vettamangalam, Karur District - 639 117

44. Care College of Arts & Science, No.27, Thayanur Village, Trichy 620 009

45. Christhu Raj College, Panjapur, Edamalaipatti Pudur, Tiruchirappalli - 620 012

46. CSI - Bishop Solomon Doraisawmy College of Arts and Science, Karur - 639001

47. Dharmambal Ramasamy Arts & Science College, Orathanadu T.k.Thanjavur - 614 625.

48. Dr. Nallikuppusamy Arts College, Manakkarambai, Thanjavur - 613 003.

49. Elizabeth College of Arts and Science, Annamangalam(P.O), Vepanthattai T.K, Perambalur - 620 102

50. Enathi Rajappa College of Arts & Science, Enathi Post, Pattukkottai - 614 615

51. Imayam College of Arts & Science, Thuraiyur- 621 206

52. Indra Ganesan College of Arts & Science, Madurai Main Road, Manikandam Post, Tiruchirappalli 620 012

53. Jairams Arts and Science College NH-7 Salem Bye-Pass Road, (Near) Mahamariamman Temple Karur -639 002.

54. Jesu Arts and Science College (Co-Educational), Alangudi, Pudukkottai Dist. -622 301.

55. Kokila Arts & Science College (Co-education), Viralimalai, Manaparai Road, Pudukkottai

56. Kongu College of Arts & Science, Deeran Chinnamalai Nagar, Karur - 639 006.

57. Krishna College of Arts and Science, UGR Nagar, Kolluthannipatty, Melapaguthi Village, Kadavur (Tk), Karur (Dt.) -621 301

58. Kurinji College of Arts & Science, Green Ways Road, Tiruchirappalli - 620 002.

59. M.I.E.T. Arts & Science College, Gundur, Tiruchirappalli - 620 007.

60. Mahatma Arts and Science College, Ariyur Village, Illuppur Taluk, Pudukkottai District- 622 101

61. Maruthu Pandiyar College, Vallam (P.O.), Thanjavur - 613 403

62. MASS College of Arts and Science, Kumbakonam - 612 501

63. Meenakshi Chandrasekaran College of Arts & Science, Pattukkottai - 614 626

64. Meenakshi Ramasamy Arts and Science College, Udaiyarpalayam, Ariyalur-.621 804.

65. Modern Arts and Science College, 35A, Sannathi Street, Jayankondam, - 621 802

66. Mother Terasa College of Arts and Science, Mettusalai, Veerappatti Village, Illupur (PO), Pudukkottai Dt. - 622 102

67. Naina Mohamed College of Arts & Science, Rajendrapuram, Pudukkottai - 614 624

68. National Arts and Science College TrichyRoad, Jayankondam Ariyalur Dt. 621 802

69. Navalar Na. Mu. Venkatasamy Nattar Thiruvarul Kallori, Kabilar Nagar, Vennatrankarai, Thanjavur - 613 003.

70. Nethaji Subash Chandra Bose College, Thiruvarur - 614 001

71. Paventhar Bharathidasan College of Arts & Science, Pudukkottai - 622 515.

72. Rajagiri Dawood Batcha College of Arts & Science, Papanasam, Thanjavur - 614 207

73. S.K. Arts & Science College Thamaraipulam, Vedaranyam 614 809

74. S.K. College of Arts and Science, Melavasal, Mannargudi, Thiruvarur District- 614 014.

75. S.R.V. College of Arts & Science, Pirattiyur, Tiruchirappalli - 620 009

76. Sembodai R.V. Arts & Science College, Vedaraniyam T.K., Nagapattinam-614 809

77. Sir Issac Newton Arts and Science College, Pappakoil Village, Anthanapettai (PO),Nagappatinam Dt. - 611 001

78. Sri Amaraavathi College of Arts and Science, Velliannai, Karur - 639 908

79. Sri Meenakshi Vidiyal College of Arts & Science, Valanadu Kaikatty, Marungapuri Tk, Tiruchirappalli Dt. 621 305

80. Sri Sankara Arts and Science College, Asur, Kumbakonam, 612 501

81. Sri Venkateshwara College of Arts & Science, Peravurani - 614 804.

82. Srinivasan College of Arts and Science, Perambalur -621 212

83. SRM Trichy Arts & Science College, Irungalur Village, Mannachanallur TK, Tiruchirappalli - 621 105

84. St. Peter's Arts and Science College, Melaneduvai Post, Adimadam, Udayarpalayam Tk, Ariyalur (Dt) - 621 801

85. Sudharsan College of Arts Science, Perumanadu Villages, Iluppur Taluk, Pudukkottai Dt

86. Swami Dayananda College of Arts & Science, Tiruvarur - 612 610

87. Swami Vivekananda Arts & Science College, Sami Arul Nagar, Vallam, Thanjavur - 613 007

88. Vailankanni Matha Arts and Science College, ECR Main Road, Prathabaramapuram, Keelvelur TK, Nagapattinam 611 111.

89. Valluvar College of Science and Management, Kodaiyur, Aravakurichi Taluk, Karur - 639 003

90. Vikas College of Arts & Science, Inamkulathur, Srirangam TK, Tiruchirappalli 621 303.

91. ABC College of Arts and Science for Women, Erichy, Chithamaraviduthi Po, Aranthangi (Tk), Pudukkottai 614 622.

92. Aiman College of Arts & Science for Women, K. Sathanur, Tiruchirappalli - 620 021.

93. Annai Ayesha Arts & Science College for Women, College Main Raod, Valikandapuram, Perambalur Dt 621 115.

94. Annai Khadeeja Arts and Science College for Women, Kandanivayal Village, Edayathimangalam Po., Manamelkudi Tk., Pudukkottai (Dt.) - 6214620.

95. Annai Women's College, Aurobindo Nagar, Vennaimalai, Karur 639 006.

96. Arasu College of Arts & Science for Women, Panduthakaran Pudhur, Punjai Kadambankurichy Village, Manmangalam TK, Karur Dt. - 639006.

97. Auxilium College of Arts and Science for Women, Regunathapuram Village, Alangudi Taluk, Pudukottai Dt - 622 302

98. Bharathi Vidyalaya College of Arts & Science (Women), Trichy Road,
Thirugokaranam(PO), Pudukkottai - 622002

99. Bon Secours Arts and Science College for Women, Ruckmanipalayam, Mannargudi 614 001, Thiruvarur Dt.

100. Bon Secours College for Women, Vilar Bye pass Road, Thanjavur - 613 006.

101. Chidambaram Pillai College for Women, Manachanallur, Tiruchirappalli - 621 005.

102. Dr. M. Sivakannu Women's Arts & Science College, Ayakkaranpulam, Vedaranyam (Tk) Nagapattinam Dt. 614 707

103. Idhaya College of Women, Sakkottai, Kumbakonam 612 001.

104. Karur Velalar college of Arts Science for Women, SF.No. 14/3, Kuppam Village, Karur- Erode Main Road, Kuppam (PO), Aravakurichi Tk., Karur Dt. 639 111.

105. M.I.T. College of Arts & Science for Women, Annai Nagar, Musiri TK, Tiruchirappalli Dt. - 621 211.

106. Meera College of Arts and Science for Women, Thanjavur Main Road, Keelapalur Post, Ariyalur - 621707

107. Mother Gnanamma Women's College of Arts and Science, Varadarajanpet,
Jayankondam Taluk, Ariyalur District - 621 805.

108. Queens College of Arts & Science for Women, Punal Kulam, Kandarvakottai, Pudukkottai - 613 303

109. Rabiammal Ahamed Maideen College for Women, Thiruvarur - 610 002.

110. S.M.K. College of Arts and Science for Women, Kilakuvadi, Thuraiyur, Tiruchirappalli Dt.

111. Servite Arts and Science College for Women, T.Iadaiayapatti, Kalladai Village, Thogaimalai Panchayat, Karur - 621 313

112. Shrimati Indira Gandhi College, Tiruchirappalli - 620 002.

113. Sri Bharathi Arts and Science College for Women, Pudukkottai 622 303

114. Sri Sarada Niketan College of Science for Women, Karur - 639 005.

115. Sri Saradha College for Women, Perambalur - 621 212.

116. Subashakthi College of Arts and Science for Women, Sathiyamangalam Post, Kulithalai T.K., Karur Dt. - 639 120

117. Sulthana Abdullah Rowther College for Women, Thiruvarur - 614 101

118. Uswathun Hasana Mamaji Haji Abdul Latheef Women's College, Pallapatti, Karur - 639 205

119. Vinayaga College of Arts and Science for Women, Karuppur, Keelapaluvur, Ariyalur Dt-621 707

Notable faculty
 Muthusamy Lakshmanan, theoretical physicist (Shanti Swarup Bhatnagar laureate)

Rankings

The National Institutional Ranking Framework (NIRF) ranked Bharathidasan University 77th overall in India and 53rd among universities in 2020.

References

External links
 Bharathidasan University official website
https://www.thehindu.com/news/cities/Tiruchirapalli/fellowship/article33927435.ece
https://www.thehindu.com/news/cities/Tiruchirapalli/student/article36737380.ece

 
Trichy
Universities and colleges in Tiruchirappalli
Educational institutions established in 1982
1982 establishments in Tamil Nadu